Teacher's First Born (Swedish: Frokens forsta barn) is a 1950 Swedish comedy film directed by Schamyl Bauman and starring Sickan Carlsson, Edvin Adolphson and Viveca Serlachius. It was shot at the Centrumateljéerna Studios in Stockholm. The film's sets were designed by the art director Bibi Lindström.

Synopsis
An author is planning a book about single mothers, but his publisher is not convinced he knows enough about the subject and places an advertisement for single mothers to assist. The former journalist Sonja Broberg is very short of money and needs the job but is childless, so she borrows a boy from a children's home in order to support the masquerade.

Cast
 Sickan Carlsson as 	Sonja Broberg, journalist
 Edvin Adolphson as 	Johannes Porshammar
 Olof Winnerstrand as 	Albert Wahlstrand
 Dagmar Ebbesen as 	Viktoria
 Viveca Serlachius as 	Birgit Björk
 Sven Lindberg as 	Willgot Mosch
 Douglas Håge as 	Gustafsson
 Nils Kihlberg as 	Göran Hallman
 Gösta Cederlund as Adolf Mosch
 Gull Natorp as 	Betty Mosch
 Christer Borg as 	Lukas
 Harriet Andersson as 	Hallman's bride 
 Frithiof Bjärne as 	Police 
 Astrid Bodin as 	Augusta 
 John Botvid as 	Mr. Gran 
 Carl-Axel Elfving as 	'Nysis', photographer
 Mona Geijer-Falkner as 	Sales woman 
 Axel Högel as 	Karlsson, groom 
 Stig Johanson as Bus driver 
 Magnus Kesster as Police 
 Wilma Malmlöf as 	Cleaning-woman 
 Sten Sture Modéen as 	Young man 
 Bellan Roos as 	Willgott's hostess 
 Alf Östlund as 	Postman

References

Bibliography 
 Qvist, Per Olov & von Bagh, Peter. Guide to the Cinema of Sweden and Finland. Greenwood Publishing Group, 2000.
Segrave, Kerry & Martin, Linda.  The Continental Actress: European Film Stars of the Postwar Era--biographies, Criticism, Filmographies, Bibliographies. McFarland, 1990.

External links 
 

1950 films
Swedish comedy films
1950 comedy films
1950s Swedish-language films
Films directed by Schamyl Bauman
1950s Swedish films